The 2A36 Giatsint-B ("Hyacinth")  is a Soviet/Russian towed 152 mm field gun which entered service in 1975. The 2A36 is designed to suppress and destroy enemy manpower and equipment. It is also suitable for counter-battery fire. The gun can be used in various weather conditions and has been tested in temperatures ranging from −50 °C to 50 °C. The gun is in use in Russia, a number of CIS countries, Finland, Iraq, and Ukraine.  It was also used by the Lebanese Army to fire into the heavily fortified Nahr el-Bared refugee camp during the conflict there. Lebanon possibly acquired some in a major arms shipment from Iraq shortly before the end of the Lebanese Civil War.

Design 
The 2A36 is fitted with a semi-automatic breech block, a hydro-pneumatic battery, which uses the energy from the recoil, and a chain-driven rammer for the projectile and the cased propellant charge. The carriage is raised with hydraulic power. It is also equipped with a two-speed mechanism for elevation.

The gun barrel is 152 mm caliber, 49 calibre lengths, and is rifled. The length of the barrel (including muzzle brake) is 8,197 mm (27 ft). The carriage is forked and suspended.

Modernization 
Some 2A36s have been modernized and are equipped with:
 Battery
 "NAP" satellite positioning unit
 Satellite receiver
 Antenna unit
 Self-orientating gyroscopic angle-measuring system
 Mechanical speed gauge

Ammunition 
The gun uses separate-loading cased charges.
 VOF39 with OF-29 fragmentation shell. This shell weighs 46 kg and contains 6.73 kg of Hexal (A-IX-2).
 ZVOF86 with the OF-59 rocket-assisted projectile, which can destroy targets at ranges up to 30–33 km.
 nuclear ammunition of the 0.1-0.2 kiloton yield range.
 cargo shell 30-13 able to carry dumb and smart submunitions, active and passive radio jamming.
 anti-tank and smoke shells.

Dimensions 
The gun is 12.92 m long in transport configuration and 12.30 m long in firing configuration.

The height is 2.76 m (in transport configuration) and the under carriage is 2.34 m wide. The wheel diameter is 1.08 m, and the width of the wheel is 300 mm. Normal tire pressure is 470kPa.

Design history 
The Perm Automobile Factory SKV started to develop a new 152 mm gun in November 1968, which was to have an extended range of fire. Two variants were planned from the beginning – the towed version, 2A36 Giatsint-B, and the self-propelled variant, 2A37 or 2S5 Giatsint-S.

The guns were field tested in 1971–1972, and deliveries to the Soviet Army began in 1975.  the 2A36 is still considered to be reliable, mobile, and capable of delivering heavy firepower.

Unit deployment 
The guns are usually deployed in batteries of six to eight guns; promotional material claims that a battery can place more than 1 tonne of projectiles on a target in one minute. When towed the carriage is supported by a four-wheel (two wheels on each side) walking beam suspension, permitting the gun to be towed over rough terrain at speeds up to 30 km/h (18.6 mp/h). In firing position the trail legs are split and the gun rests on a circular jack under the forward part of the carriage. This arrangement allows for gun traverse of 25 degrees to the left and right. Several types of trail spades are available to suit the season; the summer spades are larger to suit softer ground.

Operators

Current operators 
 
 
 
  – designated 152 K 89

Former operators 
  – passed on to successor states.

See also  
 M198 howitzer
 2S5 Giatsint-S

References

External links 

 EnemyForces.com 2A36 Giasint-B

152 mm artillery
Field artillery
Artillery of the Soviet Union
Military equipment introduced in the 1970s